The Copa del Rey  1905 was the 3rd staging of the Copa del Rey, the Spanish football cup competition.

The competition started on 16 April 1905, and concluded on 20 April 1905, with the last group stage match, in which Madrid FC lifted the trophy for the first time ever with two victories over San Sebastián Recreation Club and Athletic Bilbao. The three teams entered in the competition disputed the tournament by playing against each other in two games, with a third not played.

As the Catalonia championship was unfinished, Catalonia could not send a participant.

Qualification Match

Note: The match was abandoned in the 35th minute with Madrid leading 2–0 after Moncloa walked off to protest the officiating of Prado.

Group Stage Matches

Notes

External links
 linguasport.com
RSSSF.com 
IFFHS.de

1905
1905 domestic association football cups
Copa